Natalie Claire Cornah (born 21 January 1968) is a British (Cornish) television journalist, and a main regular newsreader for BBC South West's Spotlight, from Mannamead in Plymouth.

Life
Cornah  was born in Newquay. She has an older sister (born 1961). Her father was in the Royal Air Force. She attended Tretherras School in Newquay. She started at the Cornish Guardian as a journalist. She worked at BBC Radio Cornwall. She joined Spotlight in 1991 at BBC South West. She lives in Plymouth. She was married on 12 November 2005 in Newquay.

See also

 Media in Cornwall

Footnotes

External links
 Spotlight profile
 IMDb

1968 births
BBC newsreaders and journalists
Mass media in Cornwall
People from Newquay
Mass media people from Plymouth, Devon
Television personalities from Cornwall
Television personalities from Devon
Living people